Tamás Nagy (born 18 January 1988) is a Hungarian football player who plays for Teskánd KSE.

References
HLSZ

1988 births
Living people
People from Ózd
Hungarian footballers
Association football defenders
Kazincbarcikai SC footballers
Fehérvár FC players
Bőcs KSC footballers
Diósgyőri VTK players
Lombard-Pápa TFC footballers
Zalaegerszegi TE players
Nyíregyháza Spartacus FC players
Kaposvári Rákóczi FC players
Nemzeti Bajnokság I players
Nemzeti Bajnokság II players
Sportspeople from Borsod-Abaúj-Zemplén County